Secrets of Soho is a solo album by British singer songwriter Tim Arnold that was released in 2006. Arnold went on to write an original story derived from the themes and characters on the album, resulting in the new stage musical Marina. In 2009, actress Lisa Dillon joined Arnold as co-writer on the script for the stage musical, which was completed in 2010.

References

External links 
 Official website for the stage musical

2006 albums
British musicals
2010 musicals